Causality is the influence that connects one process or state, the cause, with another process or state, the effect, where the cause is partly responsible for the effect, and the effect is partly dependent on the cause.

Causality may also refer to:

Economics 
 Granger causality, a statistical hypothesis test
 Causal layered analysis, a technique used in strategic planning and futures studies

Philosophy 
 Causal determinism
 Causal theory of reference
 Causalism
 Causality (philosophy)
 Fallacy of the single cause
 Humean definition of causality
 Universal causation, the proposition that everything in the universe has a cause and is thus an effect of that cause

Science and engineering 
 Causality (physics)
 Causal sets
 Causal dynamical triangulation
 Causal filter
 Causal perturbation theory
 Causal system
 Causality loop
 Causal structure

Other uses 
 Causal-final case, a grammatical case in Hungarian and Chuvash
 Causal loop diagram, infographics concept
 Causal Markov condition, in mathematics
 Causality (book), a 2009 book by Judea Pearl
 Causality (video game), 2017 video game by Loju

See also
 Casualty (disambiguation)
 Causation (disambiguation)
 Cause and effect (disambiguation)
 Cause (disambiguation)